Eimear O'Kane is a film producer.

On January 24, 2012, she was nominated for an Academy Award for the short film Pentecost.

References

External links

Living people
Year of birth missing (living people)